Jentl Gaethofs (born 21 April 1994) is a Belgian footballer who currently plays for FC Wezel Sport as a central midfielder.

External links

Belgian footballers
Association football midfielders
K.R.C. Genk players
Lommel S.K. players
K.F.C. Dessel Sport players
Challenger Pro League players
1993 births
Living people